Sadat Mahalleh or Sadat Mahaleh may refer to:

Gilan Province
Sadat Mahalleh, Ahandan, Lahijan County
Sadat Mahalleh, Baz Kia Gurab, Lahijan County
Sadat Mahalleh, Chaf, Langarud County
Sadat Mahalleh, Divshal, Langarud County
Sadat Mahalleh, Otaqvar, Langarud County
Sadat Mahalleh, Rudsar
Sadat Mahalleh, Sowme'eh Sara

Mazandaran Province
Sadat Mahalleh, Babol
Sadat Mahalleh, Babolsar
Sadat Mahalleh, Baladeh, Nur County
Sadat Mahalleh, Chamestan, Nur County
Sadat Mahalleh, Ramsar
Sadat Mahalleh, Sari
Sadat Mahalleh, Tehran